Koya are an Indian tribal community found in the states of Andhra Pradesh, Telangana, Chhattisgarh, and Odisha. Koyas call themselves Koitur in their dialect. The Koyas speak the Koya language, also known as Koya basha, which is a Dravidian language related to Gondi.

Koyas are commonly referred to as Koi, Koyalu, Koyollu, Koya Doralu, Dorala Sattam, etc. Koya tribes can be further divided into Koya, Doli Koya, Gutta Koya or Gotti Koya, Kammara Koya, Musara Koya, Oddi Koya, Pattidi Koya, Rasha Koya, Lingadhari Koya (ordinary), Kottu Koya, Bhine Koya, Raja Koya, etc.

Population & Livelihood 

The Koya population is concentrated in northeastern Telangana, northern Andhra Pradesh, far-southern Chhattisgarh and southwestern Odisha. In Telangana they live mainly in Khammam, Bhadradi Kothagudem and Warangal districts and are sparsely found in the old Adilabad and Karimnagar districts. In Andhra Pradesh the Koya mainly live in West Godavari and East Godavari districts, while in Odisha they live almost exclusively and are the dominant tribe in Malkangiri district in the far southwest of the state. in Chhattisgarh they live in the far-southern Bastar region, mainly in the districts of Sukma and Bijapur. The Koya in Andhra Pradesh and Telangana had a population of 590,739  according to the 2011 census. However, many became residents of Andhra Pradesh when their lands became part of Andhra Pradesh during the Polavaram project. There are another 147,137 Koya in Odisha, and approximately 46,978 Dorla (who are a mixed group in-between Gondi and Koya) in Chhattisgarh.

According to Edgar Thurston, the Koya were formerly armed soldiers in the service of the various palegars in the region, and the time of his writing, practiced podu cultivation. Today the Koya are mainly settled cultivators and artisans, expertise in making  bamboo furniture including mats for fencing, dust pans, and baskets. They grow Jowar, Ragi, Bajra and other millets. Tubers and roots such as Tella Chenna Gadda, Kirismatilu and edible green leaves such as Chencheli, Doggali, Gumuru, bacchalakura, gongura, pacchakura, pullakusiru, Thota kura, Boddukura are dietary staples as are curries made from some of these ingredients.

Koya practice marriage after maturity, and infant marriage is not practiced. The bride's maternal uncle has the deciding factor in the match, and cross-cousin marriages are permitted and common. Usually a wealthy groom will have no issues in finding a bride, but if they are poor enough, they can bribe the village headman to allow them to capture the bride. In the most simple Koya wedding ceremony, the bride bends her head and the groom leans over her, while water is poured on the husband's head by friends. Once the water has drained off the bride's head, they are said to be man and wife. They then drink milk, eat rice, and walk around a mound of earth organised under a pandal. They then get elders' blessings and go to their new home.

Displacement 

The tribal community faces the new threats of development and conflicts, posing a serious questions on its existence and civilization. For instance, the displacement and migration of Gotti koyas tribals taking place in Andhra Pradesh. In the absence of land and access to a forest, the Koyas depend on wage labour in farm lands. The scarcity of these jobs lead to malnutrition of children and instances of anemia in women. The Andhra Pradesh state government proposed Polavaram Project is posing a serious threat of displacement of 170,275 Koyas of the tribal population and more than 276 villages in the Khammam district of Bhadrachalam, Palwancha divisions.

Genetics
According genetic study on Indian population in 2004, Koya carry 70% Y Haplogroup H which found in South Asia.

See also
Sakini Ramachandraih

References

External links

Andhra Pradesh Tribal Welfare Department
Ministry of Tribal Affairs

Scheduled Tribes of Andhra Pradesh
Telugu society
Dravidian peoples
Scheduled Tribes of Chhattisgarh
Scheduled Tribes of Odisha